Milind Shinde is an Indian actor and film director who works in Marathi, Kannada and Hindi films. He started his career with Girish Karnad's Hindi television serials and Kannada films. He is well known for his portrayal in the Marathi film Natrang. He has acted, directed and produced Marathi films.

Shinde has also directed the Marathi movie Re Raya in 2018, in which Bhushan Pradhan plays main lead.

Filmography

Television

References

External links
 

Indian male film actors
Living people
Male actors in Marathi cinema
Male actors in Marathi theatre
Indian male soap opera actors
Indian male comedians
Male actors from Mumbai
Marathi actors
Year of birth missing (living people)
Male actors in Marathi television